The sock and buskin are two ancient symbols of comedy and tragedy. In ancient Greek theatre, actors in tragic roles wore a boot called a buskin (Latin cothurnus). The actors with comedic roles wore only a thin-soled shoe called a sock (Latin soccus).

Melpomene, the muse of tragedy, is often depicted holding the tragic mask and wearing buskins. Thalia, the muse of comedy, is similarly associated with the mask of comedy and comic's socks. Some people refer to the masks themselves as "Sock and Buskin."

References

Drama
Ancient Greek theatre
Symbols
Professional symbols
Masks in theatre